Mark Sugrue (born 1993) is an Irish Gaelic footballer and hurler who plays for club side Bandon. He has also lined out with divisional side Carbery and at inter-county level with the Cork senior football team. He usually lines out in the forwards.

Honours

University College Cork
Fitzgibbon Cup: 2013

Bandon
Cork Premier Intermediate Hurling Championship: 2016
Cork Intermediate Football Championship: 2016
Cork Intermediate Hurling Championship: 2011
Cork Junior A Football Championship: 2015
South West Junior A Football Championship: 2011, 2015

Cork
McGrath Cup: 2014
All-Ireland Intermediate Hurling Championship: 2014
Munster Intermediate Hurling Championship: 2014
All-Ireland Junior Football Championship: 2013
Munster Junior Football Championship: 2013
Munster Under-21 Football Championship: 2012, 2013, 2014
Munster Minor Football Championship: 2010

References

1993 births
Living people
Dual players
UCC hurlers
Bandon Gaelic footballers
Bandon hurlers
Carbery Gaelic footballers
Cork inter-county Gaelic footballers
Irish schoolteachers
People from Bandon, County Cork